Diaptomus is a genus of copepods with a single eye spot. It is superficially similar in size and appearance to Cyclops. However it has characteristically very long first antennae that exceed the body length. In addition, the females carry the eggs in a single sac rather than the twin sacs seen in Cyclops. It is a copepod of larger freshwater ponds, lakes and still waters.

Species
Diaptomus contains more than 60 species; many species formerly included in Diaptomus are now in separate genera such as Aglaodiaptomus and Notodiaptomus. One species, the German endemic D. rostripes, is included on the IUCN Red List as a Data Deficient species.

Diaptomus affinis Ulyanin, 1875
Diaptomus africanus Daday, 1910
Diaptomus alpestris (Vogt, 1845)
Diaptomus angustaensis Turner, 1910
Diaptomus armatus Herrick, 1882
Diaptomus azureus Reid, 1985
Diaptomus barabinensis Stepanova, 2008
Diaptomus bidens Brehm, 1924
Diaptomus biseratus Gjorgjewic, 1907
Diaptomus borealis (Fischer, 1851)
Diaptomus caeruleus (Koch, 1844)
Diaptomus caesius (Koch, 1844)
Diaptomus carinifera Lowndes, 1934
Diaptomus carnicus Senna, 1890
Diaptomus castaneti Burckhardt, 1920
Diaptomus castor (Jurine, 1820)
Diaptomus claviger O. F. Müller, 1785
Diaptomus cookii King, 1855
Diaptomus cyaneus Gurney, 1909
Diaptomus falcifer Daday, 1905
Diaptomus falsomirus Kiefer, 1972
Diaptomus flagellatus Ulyanin, 1874
Diaptomus flagellifer Brehm, 1953
Diaptomus fluminensis Reid, 1985
Diaptomus fuscatus Brady, 1913
Diaptomus ganesa (Brehm, 1950)
Diaptomus gatunensis Marsh, 1913
Diaptomus giganteus Herrick, 1881
Diaptomus glacialis Lilljeborg, 1889
Diaptomus guernei Imhof, 1891
Diaptomus helveticus Imhof, 1885
Diaptomus hyalinus (Koch, 1844)
Diaptomus informis (Kiefer, 1936)
Diaptomus innominatus Brady, 1907
Diaptomus kenitraensis Kiefer, 1926
Diaptomus kentuckyensis Chambers, 1881
Diaptomus kincaidi Damkaer, 1988
Diaptomus leoninicollinus Marsh, 1913
Diaptomus ligericus Labbé, 1927
Diaptomus lighti M. S. Wilson, 1941
Diaptomus ligusticus Brian, 1927
Diaptomus linus Brandorff, 1973
Diaptomus longicornis Nicolet, 1848
Diaptomus maria King, 1855
Diaptomus meridionalis Kiefer, 1933
Diaptomus mirus Lilljeborg in Guerne & Richard, 1889
Diaptomus muelleri (Ferussac, 1806)
Diaptomus negrensis Andrade & Brandorff, 1975
Diaptomus nigerianus Brady, 1910
Diaptomus ovatus (Koch, 1844)
Diaptomus palustris Kiss, 1960
Diaptomus pattersonii (Templeton, 1838)
Diaptomus pictus Brady, 1913
Diaptomus pollux King, 1855
Diaptomus rehmanni Grochmalicki, 1913
Diaptomus rostripes Herbst, 1955
Diaptomus rubens (O. F. Müller, 1785)
Diaptomus rubens (Koch, 1844)
Diaptomus santafesinus Ringuelet & Ferrato, 1967
Diaptomus silvaticus S. Wright, 1927
Diaptomus staphylinus (Milne Edwards, 1840)
Diaptomus tenuicornis (Dana, 1849)
Diaptomus trybomi Lilljeborg in Guerne & Richard, 1889
Diaptomus uxorius King, 1855
Diaptomus vexillifer Brehm, 1933
Diaptomus wolterecki (Brehm, 1933)
Diaptomus zografi Kritchagin, 1887

References

Diaptomidae